Cyperus tenuispiculatus is a species of sedge that is endemic to parts of central Madagascar.

The species was first formally described by the botanist Johann Otto Boeckeler in 1884.

See also 
 List of Cyperus species

References 

tenuispiculatus
Taxa named by Johann Otto Boeckeler
Plants described in 1884
Endemic flora of Madagascar